Suburbia Roller Derby (SRD) is a roller derby league based in Yonkers, New York. Founded in 2007, Suburbia Roller Derby is a member of the Women's Flat Track Derby Association.

History
Suburbia was founded in by Slim Fast and Suffah Kate, two former members of the CT RollerGirls. The league has three home teams, plus two travel teams which compete against teams from other leagues.

The league began bouting in late 2007 and, by mid-2008, it had more than thirty skaters. In February 2009, it became a member of the Women's Flat Track Derby Association, and in 2010, it hosted "Derby in the Burbs", that year's WFTDA Eastern Regional Tournament. In 2013, Suburbia qualified for WFTDA Playoffs for the first time, as the tenth seed at the Division 2 tournament in Kalamazoo, Michigan. Suburbia went winless for the weekend, including a 233-221 loss to Queen City Roller Girls, to finish in tenth place. Suburbia returned to Division 2 Playoffs in 2014 as the ninth seed at the tournament in Duluth, Minnesota. Suburbia made it to the fifth place game but lost to Treasure Valley Rollergirls 236-111 and finished in sixth place.

Rankings

References

Roller derby leagues established in 2007
Roller derby leagues in New York (state)
Sports in Yonkers, New York
2007 establishments in New York (state)